Bernice Bing (10 April 1936 – 18 August 1998) was a Chinese American lesbian artist involved in the San Francisco Bay Area art scene in the 1960s. She was known for her interest in the Beats and Zen Buddhism, and for the "calligraphy-inspired abstraction" in her paintings, which she adopted after studying with Saburo Hasegawa.

Bernice Bing was a co-founder of SF’s SCRAP, according to the 2013 film about her life and an article in the SF City College Guardsman.

Early life 
Bernice Lee Bing, given the nickname “Bingo” as a child, was born in Chinatown, San Francisco, California, in 1936. Bing's father was an immigrant from Southern China, while her mother was born in America.

When Bing was six years old, her mother died due to a heart ailment,  leaving Bing with limited exposure to her traditional Chinese heritage. Raised in numerous Caucasian foster homes with her sister, Bing also lived in the Ming Quong Home, a girls' custodial home in Oakland's Chinatown, for some time. Bing occasionally stayed in Oakland with her grandmother, whose praises fostered Bing's interest in art. As a rebellious child who did not do well academically, Bing turned to drawing, which she said "kept [her] connected."

Bing was involved in the arts throughout high school, winning several local and regional art contests. After graduating from Oakland Technical High School in 1955, she received a National Scholastic Award to the California College of Arts and Crafts (CCAC) initially as an advertising major, then later as a painting one. She attended school with fellow abstract expressionist painter George Miyasaki & sculptor Manuel Neri. During her time there, Bing was instructed by Nathan Oliveira (1928-2010), Richard Diebenkorn (1922-1993), and Saburo Hasegawa (1906-1957), who especially made an impact on Bing. A Japanese-born painter, Hasegawa introduced Bing to Zen Buddhism, Chinese philosophers, including Lao Tzu and Po Chu-i, and traditional calligraphy. Her encounter with Hasegawa also incited her to start thinking of her identity as an Asian woman.

In 1958, after one semester in CCAC, Bing transferred to the California School of Fine Arts (now known as the San Francisco Art Institute). There, she studied with Elmer Bischoff and Frank Lobdell and eventually earned a B.F.A. with honors in 1959 followed by an M.F.A. in 1961. To support herself as a student, Bing also maintained a studio in North Beach above the Old Spaghetti Factory, a popular artist hangout.

By the late 1950s and early 1960s, the Bay Area art scene had become lively, and Bing was close to many of those artists. Her wider circle of friends, many of which were prominent Bay Area abstract painters, included Joan Brown, Wally Hedrick, Jay DeFeo, Bruce Conner and Fred Martin.

Early career 

Following college, Bing became involved in the San Francisco Bay Area art scene.

In 1960, while accompanying Joan Brown to New York for the latter’s one-person show at Staempfli Gallery, she met Marcel Duchamp, an extraordinary experience for her.

In 1961, San Francisco’s Batman Gallery, an alternative Beat space with all black walls and located at 2222 Fillmore (named by poet Michael McClure and painter Bruce Conner), mounted her one-person exhibition Paintings & Drawings by Bernice Bing, which garnered praise from critics like Alfred Frankenstein from the San Francisco Chronicle. She also showed large-scale works, including her painting Las Meninas (1960) based on Diego Velázquez's Baroque court scene, also entitled Las Meninas (1656).

James Monte critically reviewed her shows in Artforum in 1963 and 1964. She moved to Mayacamas Vineyards, Napa Valley in 1963 for a three-year period but returned to Berkeley for her two-person exhibition at Berkeley Gallery.

In 1967, she took part in the first residential program of Esalen Institute, New Age Psychology and Philosophy at Big Sur, where she continued her interest in C.G. Jung’s symbolism, encountered Joseph Campbell and Alan Watts, and read Fritjof Capra’s 1975 book, Tao of Physics. From 1984 to 85, Bing traveled to Korea, Japan and China, studying traditional Chinese ink landscape painting at the Zhejiang Art Academy in Haungzhou.

In addition to art, Bing was also an activist and arts administrator. She involved herself in many programs and organizations, like the National Endowment for the Arts Expansion program (1968), the Neighborhood Arts Program (1969–71), and the San Francisco Art Festival at the San Francisco Civic Center (early 1970s). In 1977, Bing created an art workshop with the Baby Wah Chings, a Chinatown gang, after the Golden Dragon Massacre in San Francisco.

Bing also served as the first executive director of the South of Market Cultural Center (now known as SOMArts) from 1980 to 1984, expanding the programming during her time there. Her work in the community was recognized by awards in 1983 and 1984.

Traveling to China 
Bing visited China from 1984 to 1985. There, she presented lectures on Abstract Expressionism to art students. Bing spent six weeks studying Chinese calligraphy with Wang Dong Ling and  Chinese landscape painting with Professor Yang at the Zhejiang Art Academy in Hangzhou, China. She was profoundly impacted by the experience, struck by the “vastness of the country” as well as the architecture, in particular the Imperial Courts and Summer Palace.

Later career 

After returning from her travels, Bing moved from San Francisco to Philo, a hamlet in Mendocino County, California. She initially worked as a waitress and cook in order to support herself. In 1989, Bing's career was revitalized after meeting Moira Roth, a professor of art history at Mills College who suggested that Bing join the Asian American Women Artists Association (AAWAA). Bing's participation in the AAWAA helped her to incorporate her interest with identity into her art.

Final years
Bing was selected by the National Women Caucus for the Arts Visual Arts Honor Award in 1996, in partnership with a group exhibition at the Rose Museum at Brandeis University in Waltham, Massachusetts.

She died in Philo in 1998 from cancer.

Art and influence 
In her art’s bridge between East and West, Bing cited an early exposure to existential philosophy that led to her pursuit of abstraction, combined with a broad array of artistic, literary, film and musical influences characteristic of the postwar fifties: from Willem de Kooning, Franz Kline and Robert Motherwell, Albert Camus and Simone de Beauvoir, to Ingmar Bergman and Federico Fellini. Like many postwar abstractionists, she recognized the prominence of Zen Buddhism and followed author Daisetsu Teitaro Suzuki, Zen’s Western authority. In her later years she devoted her practice to Nichiren Buddhism, a branch of Buddhism based on the teachings of the 13th-century Japanese monk Nichiren (1222–1282).

Her work Mayacamas, No. 6, March 12, 1963 (1963) is held by the Fine Arts Museum of San Francisco. It was inspired by the Mayacamas Mountains of Northern California. The Crocker Art Museum in Sacramento, California has a promised gift by Bing, a large oil-on-canvas titled Velázquez Family (1961).

In 2013, a documentary film, The Worlds of Bernice Bing, was co-produced by the Asian American Women Artists Association and Queer Women of Color Media Arts Project ; Produced and Directed by Madeleine Lim; Co-Produced by Jennifer Banta Yoshida and T. Kebo Drew. In 2022-23, the Asian Art Museum hosted a show of her work.

References 

1936 births
1998 deaths
Artists from San Francisco
American people of Chinese descent
California College of the Arts alumni
American LGBT people of Asian descent
LGBT people from San Francisco
20th-century American women artists
20th-century American artists
20th-century American LGBT people
American lesbian artists